Henry Kaplan (September 13, 1926 – September 14, 2005) was a television director known for his works on Dark Shadows, Ryan's Hope, The Doctors and All My Children. He also directed seven episodes of the sitcom The Adventures of Aggie.  He owned the antique shop, Sideshow, in Manhattan:  www.nytimes.com/1977/04/29/archives/antiques-glasses-can-be-eyeopeners.html

Kaplan directed one film in his career, The Girl in the Boat, which starred Norman Wisdom and was a departure from the comedian's usual established persona.

Kaplan also for a time worked as a director with Granada Television based in London and was a director of some plays performed in the West End of London.

Selected filmography
 The Girl in the Boat (1961)

External links 
New York Times obituary
 

1926 births
2005 deaths
American expatriates in the United Kingdom
American film directors